The "World's Largest Dinosaur" is the name of a roadside tourist attraction in the form of a model Tyrannosaurus rex located in the Town of Drumheller, Alberta, Canada. The World's Largest Dinosaur is one of several dinosaur-related attractions in the Town of Drumheller and the surrounding areas, which includes Dinosaur Provincial Park.

Background

Drumheller is home to the Royal Tyrrell Museum of Palaeontology which holds over 160,000 cataloged fossils and displays a collection of approximately 800 fossils as exhibits. The Town of Drumheller has a number of pieces of public art in the form of dinosaur models that are placed throughout the community. The World's Largest Dinosaur took approximately three years to complete, which including a design stage, groundbreaking on October 2, 1999, and a grand opening on October 13, 2001. The dinosaur was built during the term of former Drumheller Mayor Phil Bryant. Each month 15 percent of the revenue generated by visitors to the World's Largest Dinosaur and the attached gift shop is directed to the World's Largest Dinosaur Legacy Fund, which reinvests funds into community economic development initiatives. The sculpture weights ,  of which is steel.

On August 27, 2018, the World's Largest Dinosaur welcomed its two-millionth visitor 18 years after the structure was opened in 2000. In 2020 the World's Largest Dinosaur underwent a CA$300,000 restoration which was partially funded by the Government of Canada through the Canadian Experiences Fund. The restoration will include a new coat of paint on the dinosaur.

The sculpture studio artists from Natureworks.com.au (An Australian Ex Museum Preparator - David Joffe) built this giant Tyrannosaurus dinosaur and is still a high attraction in Drumheller today.

Gallery

See also
Giants of the Prairies
Novelty architecture
Roadside attraction
List of largest roadside attractions

References

External links

Buildings and structures in Drumheller
Roadside attractions in Canada
Dinosaur sculptures
Outdoor sculptures in Canada
Fiberglass sculptures in Canada
Animal sculptures in Canada